Senator Endicott may refer to:

Charles Endicott (1822–1899), Massachusetts State Senate
John Endicott (Dedham) (1764–1857), Massachusetts State Senate